"The Man with the Horn" is a song performed by Genesis drummer Phil Collins, and released as a B-side for two singles from No Jacket Required. The song was originally recorded during sessions for Collins' second album, Hello, I Must Be Going!, in 1982, although It appeared as the B-side to "Sussudio" in the U.K., and as the B-side to "One More Night" in the United States. The song was re-written for an episode of Miami Vice in which Collins guest-starred called "Phil The Shill." The song was renamed "(Life is a) Rat Race.". Collins has said he has "no emotional attachment" to the song. The song was rereleased as a single, and as part of the "Other Sides" album in 2019. Before being rereleased, it charted at #38 on the Mainstream Rock Chart, in 1985.

Personnel
 Phil Collins – vocals, drums, percussion, piano
 Daryl Stuermer – guitars
 John Giblin – bass guitar
 Don Myrick – tenor saxophone solo

References

1982 songs
Phil Collins songs
Songs written by Phil Collins
Song recordings produced by Phil Collins
Song recordings produced by Hugh Padgham